Brookwood High School may refer to:

Brookwood High School (Alabama)
Brookwood High School (Georgia)
Brookwood High School (Ontario, Wisconsin)
Brookwood School